Kobylenka may refer to:
Kobylenka, Nizhny Novgorod Oblast, a settlement in Nizhny Novgorod Oblast, Russia
Kobylenka, name of the village of Kotovskoye in Tambov Oblast of the RSFSR until the 1950s

References